The Lucha Libre World Cup was a professional wrestling event and tournament organized by Mexican professional wrestling promotion Lucha Libre AAA Worldwide (AAA). The tournament took place on March 19, 2023 at Estadio de Béisbol Charros de Jalisco in Zapopan, near Guadalajara, Mexico. The 2023 edition of the tournament featured three-person teams, referred to as trios in Lucha Libre; this differed from the previous edition of the event which featured traditional two-person tag teams. 

The tournament showcased teams with wrestlers from numerous international promotions including Mexico's Nación Lucha Libre (NLL), America's All Elite Wrestling (AEW), Impact Wrestling (Impact), and the National Wrestling Alliance (NWA), Japan's Dragon Gate and Oz Academy (Oz), and Qatar Pro Wrestling (QPW). The men's tournament was won by Team Mexico (Taurus, Pentagón Jr., and Laredo Kid) and the women's tournament was won by Team United States (Deonna Purrazzo, Kamille, and Jordynne Grace).

Background
The Mexican lucha libre promotion AAA, with the financial support of the Mexican brewing company Grupo Modelo organized the first ever Lucha Libre World Cup in the summer of 2015. The tournament itself was a one-night eight-team tournament for trios, or tag teams of three wrestlers. AAA reached out to several promotions both in Mexico and around the world and arranged for six of the eight teams to come from outside AAA. Japanese wrestling promotions All Japan Pro Wrestling (AJPW) and Pro Wrestling Noah both sent teams. Both Total Nonstop Action Wrestling (TNA) and Ring of Honor (ROH), based in the United States, also sent representatives to the tournament, in each case bolstered by representatives of Lucha Underground, an AAA joint-venture project based on Los Angeles. The tournament took place on May 25, 2015, and had the AAA labelled "Dream Team" of Rey Mysterio Jr., El Patrón Alberto and Myzteziz win the tournament, defeating Team TNA/Lucha Underground (Matt Hardy, Mr. Anderson and Johnny Mundo) in the finals. A second World Cup was held in the summer of 2016. The second edition featured two tournaments, one for male wrestlers and another for female wrestlers. The men's tournament was won by Brian Cage, Chavo Guerrero Jr., and Johnny Mundo of Team Lucha Underground while the women's tournament was won by Faby Apache, Lady Apache, and Mari Apache of Team Mexico. The 2017 tournament was won by Team Mexico AAA (Pagano and Psycho Clown).

The 2023 edition, the first since 2017, was officially announced on January 17 during a press conference.

Teams

Men's

Women's

Results

Tournament brackets
Men's

Women's

See also
2023 in professional wrestling

References

2023 in professional wrestling
2023
March 2023 events in Mexico
2023 in Mexico